Upper La Tante is a town in Saint David Parish, Grenada.  It is located towards the southern end of the island.

References 

Populated places in Grenada